Kardash is a village in the Quba Rayon of Azerbaijan.

Kardash may also refer to:

Bill Kardash (1912–1997), Canadian politician
Mary Kardash (1913–1990s), Canadian Communist and feminist activist
Vasyl Kardash (born 1973), Ukrainian footballer

See also
Kardashev (disambiguation)
Qardash (disambiguation)
Kardashian family